Dennis S. Sands is an American sound engineer. He has been nominated for four Academy Awards in the category Best Sound. He has worked on more than 400 films since 1979.

Selected filmography

 South Park: Bigger, Longer, and Uncut (1999; with Tim Boyle)
 Stuart Little (1999)
 Cast Away (2000)
 Spider-Man (2002)
 The Bourne Supremacy (2004)
 The Polar Express (2004)
 Dreamgirls (2006)
 The Ant Bully (2006; with Shawn Murphy)
 The Wild (2006)
 Hellboy II: The Golden Army (2008)
 Milk (2008)
 Wanted (2008)
 Alice in Wonderland (2010)
 Contagion (2011)
 Puss in Boots (2011)
 Argo (2012)
 Flight (2012)
 The Croods (2013)
 Godzilla (2014)
 The Walk (2015)
 Allied (2016)

References

External links
 

Year of birth missing (living people)
Living people
American audio engineers
Emmy Award winners